Oscillator is an EP by Information Society. It was their first new commercial release after six-year break.

This six-song record uses the vocal stylings of newcomer Christopher Anton, as well as a range of intriguing guests and remixers. In addition to four mixes of the underground hit "Back in the Day", there is a live recording of "Great Big Disco World", made at Club Milky Robot in Osaka, Japan, in 2006.

Online release
Oscillator was released March 19, 2007, as an Internet-only EP, offered for purchase through a variety of web-based music retailers including iTunes, Napster and Rhapsody.

Track listing 
 "Back in the Day"
 "Back in the Day (Kasino Mix)"
 "Back in the Day (Electro Roots Mix)"
 "Back in the Day (Kain & Arvy Mix)"
 "I Like The Way You Werk It"
 "Great Big Disco World (Live) (feat. Vitamin C)"

CD release
A CD version of Oscillator was released June 21, 2007, with an extra audio track and a bonus CD-ROM video track.

Track listing (CD release)
 "Back In The Day"
 "I Like The Way You Werk It"
 "Great Big Disco World"
 "Back In The Day (Electro Roots Mix)"
 "I Like The Way You Werk It (Kain and Arvy Mix)"
 "Back In The Day (Kasino Mix)"
 "Back In The Day (Kain and Arvy Mix)"

Bonus
CD-ROM video: I Like the Way You Werk It produced by 13tongimp

Liner notes

Production credits
Produced by: Information Society
Music Director: Paul Robb
Recorded at Paul's house throughout 2006

Art direction: Adam King
Photography: Tyler Shields, Brandon Showers
Digital projects manager (HAKATAK): Elizabeth Evangelista

"Werk It" video by 13tongimp

Musical credits
 Paul Robb
 James Cassidy
 Christopher Anton
 Kurt Harland Larson
 Leila Mack
 Colleen Fitzpatrick
 Angela Michael
 Dave Derby

Special thanks
 Adam King
 Arvy
 Elizabeth Evangelista
 Kristin Wenzel
 Erik Hulslander
 Kasino
 Energia Radio
 Junior Kain
 13TonGimp
 Mike Schmidt the Younger
 Todd Durant

Track listing (CD release)
 "Back In The Day"
 "I Like The Way You Werk It"
 "Great Big Disco World"
 "Back In The Day (Electro Roots Mix)"
 "I Like The Way You Werk It (Kain and Arvy Mix)"
 "Back In The Day (Kasino Mix)"
 "Back In The Day (Kain and Arvy Mix)"

Bonus
CD-ROM video: I Like the Way You Werk It produced by 13tongimp

Liner notes

Production credits
Produced by: Information Society
Music Director: Paul Robb
Recorded at Paul's house throughout 2006

Art direction: Adam King
Photography: Tyler Shields, Brandon Showers
Digital projects manager (HAKATAK): Elizabeth Evangelista

"Werk It" video by 13tongimp

Musical credits
 Paul Robb
 James Cassidy
 Christopher Anton
 Kurt Harland Larson
 Leila Mack
 Colleen Fitzpatrick
 Angela Michael
 Dave Derby

Special thanks
 Adam King
 Arvy
 Elizabeth Evangelista
 Kristin Wenzel
 Erik Hulslander
 Kasino
 Energia Radio
 Junior Kain
 13TonGimp
 Mike Schmidt the Younger
 Todd Durant

External links
 Information Society official site
 Information Society Brazilian fan site
 InSoc Official Site (historical archive)
 Oscillator EP release details on the official InSoc website

2007 EPs
Information Society (band) albums